is the sequel of the Japanese manga series Rosario + Vampire, written and illustrated by Akihisa Ikeda. The series follows Tsukune Aono and his monster friends, including the beautiful vampire girl Moka Akashiya, as they attend their second year at Yokai Academy, a school for monsters that was rebuilt following the events of the school festival the previous year. Season II introduces new characters and an organization called Fairy Tale to serve as an antagonist. It also delves into Moka's past with her family and the secrets of her rosario.

Rosario + Vampire: Season II began monthly serialization in the November 2007 issue of Jump Square, the successor to the now-defunct Monthly Shōnen Jump manga magazine where the first season was serialized. Its final chapter appeared in the March 2014 issue, and an epilogue chapter is planned for April. The first tankōbon was published by Shueisha on June 4, 2008, with a total of thirteen tankōbon available as of September 4, 2013. A second season of the Rosario + Vampire anime  Rosario + Vampire Capu2, was produced by Gonzo and aired in Japan on TV Osaka and other networks between October 4 and December 24, 2008, but follows a different storyline from the manga.

Like the first season, Rosario + Vampire: Season II is licensed in North America and the United Kingdom by Viz Media under their Shonen Jump Advanced imprint, and in Australia and New Zealand by Madman Entertainment. The first English volume was published on April 6, 2010, with a total of thirteen volumes available as of August 5, 2014. As with the first series, individual chapters of Season II are called "tests", and each volume of the English releases is called a "lesson". The graphic novels each feature a two-page color insert of some of the characters,  four-panel bonus comic strips, and author's notes. The English translation was done by Kaori Inoue up to volume 10, and by  Tetsuichiro Miyaki as of volume 11. The English adaptation was done by Gerard Jones up to volume 8, and by Annette Roman from volume 9 onwards.



Volume list

References

Rosario + Vampire
Rosario + Vampire chapters